Manuel Queiróz (born 1883, date of death unknown) was a Portuguese épée and foil fencer. He competed at the 1920 and 1924 Summer Olympics.

References

External links
 

1883 births
Year of death missing
Portuguese male épée fencers
Olympic fencers of Portugal
Fencers at the 1920 Summer Olympics
Fencers at the 1924 Summer Olympics
Portuguese male foil fencers